John Ripin Miller (May 23, 1938 – October 4, 2017) was an American politician, who served as a member of the United States House of Representatives from 1985 to 1993. While in Congress he championed human rights in the Soviet Union, China, and South Africa.

Miller received his LL.B. from Yale Law School and an MA in Economics from Yale Graduate School in 1964. He graduated with a BA from Bucknell University in 1959 and served as an Army Infantry officer on active duty in 1960 and later in the U.S. Army Reserves.

Miller did not run for re-election in 1992. Prior to being elected congressman, he was active in state and municipal governments, serving as assistant attorney general for Washington; vice president and legal counsel for the Washington Environmental Council; and Seattle City Councilman (1972–1979). Miller's first campaign for the City Council was tied to saving the Pike Place Market and while on the Council he oversaw the rehabilitation of the Market. He founded Seattle's urban P-Patch program, a gardening allotment program that was first of its kind in the nation which includes at least 90 sites as of 2016.  Miller led the Council in rejecting Seattle's entry into Washington Public Power Supply System nuclear plants 4 and 5 (Satsop nuclear power plant) which later went bankrupt, and unsuccessfully sought the demolition of the Alaska Way Viaduct separating Seattle's downtown from its waterfront.

Miller served as the director, Office to Monitor and Combat Trafficking in Persons for the U.S. State Department, with the rank of Ambassador-at-Large, starting in 2002. He sought to increase public awareness of modern-day slavery and nurture a worldwide abolitionist movement with the United States in the lead.  Miller resigned effective December 15, 2006, to join the faculty of George Washington University. He later taught at Yale University and was named a visiting scholar at the Institute for Governmental Studies at the University of California, Berkeley. Miller served as a distinguished senior fellow in international affairs and human rights with the Discovery Institute. Prior to his time at State, he had served as the chair of the institute, and was an English teacher at Northwest Yeshiva High School in Mercer Island, Washington.

On October 4, 2017, Miller died in Corte Madera, California from cancer at the age of 79.

See also
 List of Jewish members of the United States Congress

References

 Seattle Post-Intelligencer article on resignation from State Department (page no longer available 23 July 2008)

 .
 Seattle City Council Members, 1869-Present Chronological Listing, Seattle City Archives. Accessed online 19 July 2008.

1938 births
2017 deaths
Politicians from New York City
Military personnel from New York City
Jewish American people in Washington (state) politics
Seattle City Council members
Yale Law School alumni
Republican Party members of the United States House of Representatives from Washington (state)
George Washington University faculty
Yale University faculty
United States Ambassadors-at-Large
Educators from Washington (state)
University of California, Berkeley fellows
Discovery Institute fellows and advisors
Lawyers from Seattle
Deaths from cancer in California